The 1934 New Year Honours in New Zealand were appointments by King George V to various orders and honours to reward and highlight good works by New Zealanders. The awards celebrated the passing of 1933 and the beginning of 1934, and were announced on 1 January 1934.

The recipients of honours are displayed here as they were styled before their new honour.

Knight Bachelor
 James Trevilly Grose – of Wellington; general manager of the National Bank of New Zealand. For public services.
 Major-General William Livingstone Hatchwell Sinclair-Burgess  – general officer commanding New Zealand Military Forces.

Order of Saint Michael and Saint George

Companion (CMG)
 Professor Robert Edward Alexander – director of Canterbury Agricultural College, Lincoln.

Order of the British Empire

Commander (CBE)
Civil division
 Charles Albert Knowles – private secretary to successive high commissioners for New Zealand in London.

Officer (OBE)
Civil division
 Sibylla Emily Maude – of Christchurch. For services in connection with district nursing.
 Jane Anna Mowbray – of Auckland; president of the Auckland branch of the Victoria League.

References

New Year Honours
1934 awards
1934 in New Zealand
New Zealand awards